Vikas Thakre is an Indian politician who won the 14th Maharashtra Legislative Assembly election. He represents Nagpur West (Vidhan Sabha constituency) and belongs to the Indian National Congress. He is the President of Nagpur District Congress Committee. He is also a Trustee of Nagpur Improvement Trust (N.I.T.).

References

Indian National Congress politicians
Maharashtra MLAs 2019–2024
Living people
Year of birth missing (living people)